LP1 may refer to:
LP1 (FKA Twigs album), 2014
LP1 (Joss Stone album), 2011
LP1 (Liam Payne album), 2019
LP1 (Plastiscines album), 2007
LP-1, a rocket engine made by Vector Launch